Barry is a 1949 French historical drama film directed by Richard Pottier and Karl Anton and starring Pierre Fresnay, Simone Valère and Marc Valbel. It is set in the Napoleonic era.

Cast
 Pierre Fresnay as Le père Théotime  
 Simone Valère as Angelina Cavazza  
 Marc Valbel as Jean-Marie Sondaz  
 Pauline Carton as La mère Culoz  
 Yves Deniaud as Le sergent Brocard, dit 'La fleur'  
 Gérard Landry as Sylvain Bavoizet  
 Jean Brochard as Philémon Cavazza  
 François Joux as Le premier prieur  
 Raphaël Patorni as Une recrue 
 Julien Maffre as Un soldat fatigué  
 Alexandre Mihalesco as L'aubergiste  
 Jacques Dynam as Le moine Claudius 
 Roland Catalano as Buffi, le guide  
 Auffret
 Barry as Le chien Barry 
 Jean Boissemond 
 José Casa 
 M. Caudron  
 Evelyne Salmon as Gisèle Sondaz  
 Fernand Blot as Un paysan  
 Roger Bontemps as Le second prieur  
 Robert Le Fort as Le Frisé  
 Liliane Lesaffre as Catherine, la servante  
 Albert Michel as Un moine 
 Eliane Salmon as Gisèle Sondaz

References

Bibliography 
 Dayna Oscherwitz & MaryEllen Higgins. The A to Z of French Cinema. Scarecrow Press, 2009.

External links 
 

1940s historical drama films
French historical drama films
1949 films
1940s French-language films
Films directed by Karl Anton
Films directed by Richard Pottier
Films set in the 1800s
Films set in the 1810s
Films about dogs
French black-and-white films
1949 drama films
1940s French films